Daphnella hyalina is a species of sea snail, a marine gastropod mollusk in the family Raphitomidae.

Description
The length of the shell attains 14 mm.

The thin, transparent shell is longitudinally very minutely and closely elevately striated throughout. It is whitish, encircled by distant chestnut lines, sometimes borne on striae.

Distribution

References

 Reeve, L.A. 1845. Monograph of the genus Pleurotoma. pls 20-33 in Reeve, L.A. (ed). Conchologia Iconica. London : L. Reeve & Co. Vol. 1.

External links
 

hyalina
Gastropods described in 1845